Rexx Erected is the fourth studio album by American heavy metal/glam metal band Diamond Rexx. It was released by Crash Music Inc. on November 6, 2001.

Diamond Rexx became an alternative metal band in this album.

Track listing
All tracks written by Diamond Rexx, except where noted.
 "The Evil" – 3:04
 "No Pain (No Gain)" – 3:25
 "Kill Yourself" – 4:45
 "No Effect" – 4:22 (Diamond Rexx, Dave Andre)
 "One Step Away" – 4:27
 "Is That All" – 2:17
 "Medicine Man" – 3:20
 "Fire" – 3:01
 "Watch Your Step" – 3:13
 "Bang! Bang!" – 3:22
 "One More Day..." – 1:55

Personnel

The band 
 Nasti Habits - Lead vocals
 S.S. Priest – Guitar
 Basil Cooper – Bass
 Billy Nychay - Drums

Additional musicians 
 Laura Brejcha – Backing vocals
 Sean Johnson – Backing vocals

Production 
 Nasti Habits – Producer, mixing

References

Diamond Rexx albums